Simon Christopher Hollingsworth (born 1 October 1983) is an English cricketer. Hollingsworth is a right-handed batsman who bowls right-arm medium pace. He was born in Chertsey, Surrey.

While studying for his degree at Durham University, Hollingsworth made his first-class debut for Durham UCCE against Durham in 2004. He made two further first-class appearance in 2004, against Derbyshire.  In his two first-class matches, he scored 65 runs at an average of 13.00, with a high score of 30.

References

External links
Simon Hollingsworth at ESPNcricinfo
Simon Hollingsworth at CricketArchive

1983 births
Living people
Sportspeople from Chertsey
Alumni of Durham University
English cricketers
Durham MCCU cricketers